S. Rajam (10 February 1919 – 29 January 2010) was a distinguished Indian Carnatic musician and painter from the state of Tamil Nadu. He was a student of the Carnatic musician Papanasam Sivan and the older brother of Tamil film director and musician S. Balachander and actress S. Jayalakshmi. Rajam made his Tamil film debut in the 1934 film Seetha Kalyanam. He acted in a few more films in the lead role, before becoming a full-time musician - especially renowned for his singing - and painter. He worked as a staff artist and music supervisor at All India Radio. He is known for his series of portraits of the Trinity of Carnatic music. He is also known for popularising Koteeswara Iyer's musical compositions. He was a member of the Madras Music Academy.

Awards
 Sangeet Natak Akademi Award (in 1991). 
 Sangita Kala Acharya By the Music Academy, Chennai.
 Sangeetha Kalasikhamani 2008 by The Indian Fine Arts Society, Chennai

Filmography
Seetha Kalyanam (1934)
Radha Kalyanam (1935)
Rukmini Kalyanam (1936)
Sivakavi (1943)

References

1919 births
2010 deaths
Male Carnatic singers
Carnatic singers
Indian male painters
Recipients of the Sangeet Natak Akademi Award
Indian Tamil people
Tamil male actors
20th-century Indian male classical singers
Male actors from Tamil Nadu
Painters from Tamil Nadu
Singers from Tamil Nadu